Joseph "Jos" Roller (21 August 1929 – 4 January 1998) was a Luxembourgian footballer. He competed in the men's tournament at the 1952 Summer Olympics.

References

External links
 
 
 

1929 births
1998 deaths
Luxembourgian footballers
Luxembourg international footballers
Olympic footballers of Luxembourg
Footballers at the 1952 Summer Olympics
Sportspeople from Esch-sur-Alzette
Association football midfielders
FC Progrès Niederkorn players